Henrik Arnold Thaulow can refer to:

 Henrik Arnold Thaulow Dedichen, psychiatrist
 Henrik Arnold Thaulow Wergeland, writer